The  white sapote, scientific name Casimiroa edulis, also called casimiroa and Mexican apple, and known as cochitzapotl in the Nahuatl language (meaning "sleep-sapote") is a species of tropical fruiting tree in the family Rutaceae, native to eastern Mexico and Central America south to Costa Rica. The genus is named for "an Otomi Indian, Casimiro Gómez, from the town of Cardonal in Hidalgo, Mexico, who fought and died in Mexico's war of independence."

Description
The leaves are alternate, palmately compound with three to five leaflets, the leaflets 6–13 cm long and 2.5–5 cm broad with an entire margin, and the leaf petiole 10–15 cm long.

The fruit is an ovoid drupe, 5–10 cm in diameter, with a thin, inedible skin turning from green to yellow when ripe, and an edible pulp, which can range in flavor from bland to banana-like to peach to pear to vanilla flan.photo 1photo 2photo 3 The pulp can be creamy-white in green-skin varieties or a beige-yellow in yellow-skin varieties and has a smooth texture similar to ripe avocado. It contains from one to five seeds that are said to have narcotic properties.

Chemical constituents 
In the past 40 years, experiments carried out on the white sapote's seeds have identified many pharmacologically active compounds, including: N-methylhistamine, N,N-dimethylhistamine, and histamine. It also contains 2′,5,6-trimethoxyflavone, 2′, 6',5,6,-tetramethoxyflavone (zapotin), and 5-hydroxy-2′,6,7-trimethoxyflavone (zapotinin).

Health effects 
Several  in vitro studies have shown that zapotin has potential anticarcinogenic effects against isolated colon cancer cells.

The fruit has long been thought to produce drowsiness, as claimed by Francisco Hernández de Toledo in the 16th century, but this may be a misinterpretation of the Nahuatl name of the plant, cochitzapotl (meaning '"sleep-sapote"), as its seeds were processed to produce a poison by the Aztecs, and the seeds and leaves, but not fruit pulp of the plant, contain sleep-inducing compounds.

Taxonomy
Unlike the mamey sapote, white sapote is a member of the family Rutaceae, to which citrus belongs. The black sapote is also unrelated and is actually a species of persimmon. This confusion may be because "sapote" comes from the Nahuatl (Aztec) word tzapotl, used to describe all soft, sweet fruit. Commonly grown in northern New South Wales, Australia, and often mistaken for a persimmon, these two fruits are unrelated.

See also
List of culinary fruits

References

Further reading
Huxley, A. (1992). New RHS Dictionary of Gardening. Macmillan.
Henry A. & Vera-Caletti P. 2010. – Usages du sapotier blanc (Casimiroa spp.) en Mésoamérique. Histoire, ethnographie et botanique. Anthropobotanica 1.7-2010. in French with English abstract

Zanthoxyloideae
Tropical fruit
Flora of Central America
Trees of Costa Rica
Trees of El Salvador
Trees of Guatemala
Trees of Mexico
Medicinal plants
Edible fruits